Khaki Safed ("white dust") is a district in Farah province, Afghanistan. Its population, which is mostly Pashtun and Tajiks, was estimated at 43,000 in October 2004. The main village, Khaki Safed (also called Alagadari), is situated at 676 m altitude in the central part of the district.

Security and Politics
It was reported on 17 November 2009 that armed Taliban fighters kidnapped 5 civilians. 2 were beheaded and accused of spying while the other 3 were released. According to the Provincial police chief Faqir Mohammad Askar, the victims were innocent government employees.

References

External links
 Map of Settlements AIMS, May 2002

Districts of Farah Province